A stins (Dutch, pl. stinsen; from West Frisian stienhûs [Dutch steenhuis] "stone house", shortened to stins, pl. stinzen) is a former stronghold or villa in the province of Friesland, the Netherlands. Many stinsen carry the name "state" (related to English 'estate').

Stinsen used to belong to noblemen or prominent citizens. Most stinsen were demolished in the 19th century, when maintenance became too expensive. Several surviving stinsen are now used as museums.

Stinsen also appear in East Frisia, and are known as borg (pl. borgen) in the province of Groningen.

See also
 List of stins in Friesland
 List of castles in the Netherlands

References

External links

 Stinsen in Friesland

 1
Buildings and structures in Friesland
Castles in the Netherlands
Architecture in the Netherlands